Mobile Operational Naval Air Bases (MONABs) were a series of mobile units first formed in 1944 to provide logistical support to the Fleet Air Arm aircraft of the Royal Navy's British Pacific Fleet towards the end of World War II.

Each unit was self-contained and designed to service and repair aircraft and engines.  Each were initially assembled at the MONAB Headquarters at HMS Flycatcher (first at Ludham then Middle Wallop in the UK).

When the naval threat in the Atlantic was clearly vanishing, with the decline of Nazi Germany, proposals were made to involve the Royal Navy in the Pacific War.  The United States Navy's Commander-in-Chief, Admiral Ernest King, did not welcome this, however.  A well-known anglophobe, King preferred to exclude the British and, in addition, he laid down operating requirements that could not be met at the time.  One of these was that the Royal Navy should be self-sustaining and independent of United States Navy (USN) logistical resources for extended periods of active service.

King was effectively overruled, and the Royal Navy began establishing an adequate logistical infrastructure which included MONABs.

Units
Ten MONABs were established, most based in Australia.  The last unit was decommissioned in 1946.

 MONAB I – HMS Nabbington, Nowra, Australia
 MONAB II - HMS Nabberley, Bankstown, Australia
 MONAB III – HMS Nabthorpe, Schofields, New South Wales, Australia
 MONAB IV -
Formed up and commissioned as HMS Nabaron on 1 January 1945 at RNAS Ludham.  Embarked for Australia at Liverpool two weeks later and arrived at Sydney on 21 February.  Marked to form a forward base their equipment was diverted on to the Admiralty Islands and an operational base 2 April 1945 was commissioned HMS Naboran, Royal Naval Air Station Ponam taking over the former US Navy Airfield there.

 MONAB V - HMS Nabswick, Jervis Bay, Australia
 MONAB VI – HMS Nabstock, Maryborough, Queensland, Australia
 MONAB VII – HMS Nabreekie, Meeandah, Brisbane, Australia
 MONAB VIII – HMS Nabcatcher, Kai Tak, Hong Kong
 MONAB IX – HMS Nabrock, Sembawang, Singapore
 MONAB X – HMS Nabhurst, Middle Wallop, UK
when HMS Flycatcher was paid off at Middle Wallop on 10 April 1946.  MONAB X went around three different sites (RNAS Fearn, RNAS Inskip and RNAE Risley until it was able to move to RNAS Lossiemouth following the RAF vacating the site.

See also
List of Royal Navy shore establishments
List of air stations of the Royal Navy
Royal Navy Dockyard
Seaplane bases in the United Kingdom
Lists of military installations
Operation Ivory Soap

References

 Accessed 2 May 2007

External links
 MONABs Fleet Air Arm Archive
 Royal Navy Fleet Air Arm in Australia During WW2
 

Royal Navy bases outside the United Kingdom
 
Naval aviation units and formations of the United Kingdom